Peru Mall is a shopping mall located in Peru, Illinois, United States. The mall's anchor stores are Jo-Ann Fabrics, AMC Theatres, and Marshalls. There are 3 vacant anchor stores that were once Bergner's, JCPenney, and Sears. Other retailers include: Rue21, Claire's, Buckle, Spencer's, and a few more. Directly outside the shopping center are Applebee's and Subway restaurants. The  mall also serves as the major commercial center in the city of Peru.

History
Rubloff Company of Chicago built the mall in 1973 and 1974. It originally featured Bergner's and Montgomery Ward. The mall later gained JCPenney as a third anchor, and underwent a renovation in 1989. The Mall's Movie Theater opened in 1989 by GKC Theatres with four screens. It was expanded twice in the 1990s, first to six, then eight screens. In 2005, Carmike Cinemas took over the theater after its purchase of GKC. It was acquired by AMC Theatres in 2016. Montgomery Ward closed in the early-2000s, and Sears moved into the space in 2003. Marshalls was added as a fourth anchor in 2006. On March 17, 2017, it was announced that JCPenney would be closing as part of a plan to close 138 stores nationwide. The store closed on July 31, 2017. On July 7, 2017, it was announced that Sears would also be closing as part of a plan to close 43 stores nationwide. The store closed in October 2017. On April 18, 2018, it was announced that Bergner's would be closing as well on August 29, 2018, as parent company The Bon-Ton Stores was going out of business which left Jo-Ann Fabrics, AMC Theatres and Marshalls as the only anchors left.

On August 18, 2020, the Peru City Council voted in favor of moving forward with a plan to convert the Peru Mall into apartment complexes accompanied by a shopping and dining center. As of 2022, no redevelopment has occurred.

References

Shopping malls established in 1974
Buildings and structures in LaSalle County, Illinois
Shopping malls in Illinois
Tourist attractions in LaSalle County, Illinois
1974 establishments in Illinois